Fulgogasparrea is a genus of crustose lichens in the subfamily Xanthorioideae of the family Teloschistaceae. It has five species. The genus was circumscribed in 2013, with Fulgogasparrea decipioides assigned as the type species; this lichen had originally been formally described as a species of Caloplaca, and then a couple of years later transferred to Wetmoreana. Six are credited with authorship of the genus: Sergey Kondratyuk, Jeong Min-hye, Ingvar Kärnefelt, John Alan Elix, Arne Thell, and Jae-Seoun Hur. The genus name alludes to the resemblance of the type species with both of the Teloschistaceae genera Fulgensia (subfamily Caloplacoideae) and Gasparrinia (subfamily Xanthorioideae).

Species

Fulgogasparrea appressa 
Fulgogasparrea awasthii 
Fulgogasparrea brouardii 
Fulgogasparrea decipioides  – South Korea
Fulgogasparrea intensa  – Brazil

References

Teloschistales
Teloschistales genera
Taxa described in 2015
Taxa named by Ingvar Kärnefelt
Taxa named by John Alan Elix
Taxa named by Sergey Kondratyuk